Goat Songs is a 7" vinyl EP by The Sundowners, released on Sea Note Records in 1993. The EP is a collaboration between Palace Brothers (Will Oldham) and Smog (Bill Callahan). The EP was reissued on 21 May 1994.

Track listing
"Turkey Vulture"
"Tonight Will Be Fine" (Leonard Cohen)
"Punk Rock"
"Goats"
"Pozor"
"Tallulah"

1993 EPs
Will Oldham albums
Bill Callahan (musician) EPs